James Victory (1880 – 5 August 1946) was an Irish politician. A farmer, he was first elected to Dáil Éireann as a Fianna Fáil Teachta Dála (TD) for the Longford–Westmeath constituency at the June 1927 general election. He lost his seat at the September 1927 general election and was an unsuccessful candidate at the 1932 general election. 

He regained his seat at the 1933 general election and was re-elected for the Athlone–Longford constituency at the 1937 and 1938 general elections. He lost his seat once more at the 1943 general election.

References

1880 births
1946 deaths
Fianna Fáil TDs
Members of the 5th Dáil
Members of the 8th Dáil
Members of the 9th Dáil
Members of the 10th Dáil
20th-century Irish farmers
Politicians from County Longford